The R825 road is a regional road in south Dublin, Republic of Ireland. The road starts in Clonskeagh at the junction with the R117 (Milltown Road) and passes through Goatstown, Kilmacud and Stillorgan before ending at a junction with the N31 in Blackrock, County Dublin.

Route 
 The road starts at the junction of the R117 (Milltown Road from the west and Sandford Road from the north) and R824 (Eglinton Road). A bridge crosses the River Dodder shortly before a junction with the Beach Hill and Beaver Row road that connects to Donnybrook.  The road is known as the Clonskeagh Road until it reaches the triangle in Clonskeagh.
 At the triangle the road connects with Bird Avenue before continuing south as the Roebuck Road.
 Further along the Roebuck road leads off to the west before connecting with the R112 at Foster Avenue while the R825 stays south known as the Goatstown Road. 
 The first section of the route terminates at the crossroads in Goatstown as the road continues south as the R133, while east and west runs the R112.
 Just under 1 km further south the road starts again at the junction with the R133 and heads in a westerly direction towards Stillorgan. The road is briefly known as Drummartin Road at this point before it connects with the old route of the Lower Kilmacud Road.
 After Stillorgan the road crosses the N11 and is known as Stillorgan Park for 1 km before the road takes a left at a T-Junction and heads north as Carysfort Avenue. 
 The road terminates at the end of Carysfort Avenue where the road joins up to the N31 at Frascati Road, Blackrock.

Transport 
 The 11 bus route operated by Dublin Bus runs from St. Pappin's Road, Glasnevin to Sandyford and follows the R825 from the start in Clonskeagh to its junction with the R826. The routes 47, 75 and 116, serve parts of the Lower Kilmacud Road between the junction of the Upper Kilmacud Road and Stillorgan.  The 75 runs between Tallaght and Dún Laoghaire.  The 47 serves between Belarmine and Poolbeg Street in Dublin city centre.  The 116 serves between Whitechurch and Parnell Square. At the east end of the route Carysfort Avenue is served by the 114 running from Blackrock DART station to Ticknock.
 An on street cycle track is present from the start of the route in Clonskeagh to Goatstown. There is also an off street cycle lane on the Stillorgan Park part of the route.

See also
Roads in Ireland
National primary road
National secondary road

Regional roads in the Republic of Ireland
Roads in County Dublin